Immyrla nigrovittella is a species of snout moth in the genus Immyrla. It was described by Harrison Gray Dyar Jr. in 1906 and is known from eastern North America, including Alabama, Illinois, Maryland, Michigan, Mississippi, Ohio, Ontario, Pennsylvania, Quebec, Tennessee and West Virginia.

References 

Moths described in 1906
Phycitinae